In the United Kingdom, a deputy lieutenant is a Crown appointment and one of several deputies to the lord lieutenant of a lieutenancy area: an English ceremonial county, Welsh preserved county, Scottish lieutenancy area, or Northern Irish county borough or county.

In formal style, the postnominal letters DL may be added: e.g. John Brown, CBE, DL.

Deputy lieutenants are nominated by a lord lieutenant, to assist with any duties as may be required: see the Lieutenancies Act 1997; deputy lieutenants receive their commission of appointment via the appropriate government minister by command of the King In England and Wales, since November 2001, the minister responsible for most appointments is the Lord Chancellor, with exceptions such as the Chancellor of the Duchy of Lancaster. In Scotland, since July 1999 it has been the Scottish Ministers.

Decades ago, the number of deputy lieutenants for each county could be as few as three. Today, however, there may be well over a dozen that are appointed as the number of DLs today correlates with the population of each respective county. DLs tend to be people who either have served the local community, or have a history of public service in other fields.

DLs represent the lord lieutenant in their absence, including at local ceremonies and official events, from opening exhibitions to inductions of vicars (as requested by the Church of England). They must live within their ceremonial county, or within seven miles (11 km) of its boundary. Their appointments do not terminate with any change of lord lieutenant, but they are legally required to retire at age of 75.

One of the serving deputy lieutenants is appointed to be vice-lieutenant, who in most circumstances will stand in for the lord lieutenant when they cannot be present. The appointment as vice-lieutenant does, however, expire on the retirement of the lord lieutenant who made the choice. Generally, the vice-lieutenant would then revert to DL.

Unlike the office of lord lieutenant, which is an appointment in the gift of the Sovereign, the position of deputy lieutenant is an appointment of the Sovereign's appointee, and therefore not strictly speaking a direct appointment of the Sovereign.

See also
 Custos rotulorum
 List of Deputy Lieutenants
 Deputy lieutenants of Aberdeen
 Deputy lieutenant of Aberdeenshire
 List of deputy lieutenants of Durham
 Duchy of Lancaster
 Lord Lieutenant of the City of London

References

External links
Lieutenancies Act 1997
Department for Constitutional Affairs (now Ministry of Justice): Explanatory notes for Deputy Lieutenants 
Process of the appointments of Deputy lieutenants at gov.uk

 
Lord Lieutenancies
Ceremonial officers in the United Kingdom
Local politicians in the United Kingdom
Representatives of the British monarch
Gubernatorial titles